The 2015 Kobalt 400 was a NASCAR Sprint Cup Series race held on March 8, 2015, at Las Vegas Motor Speedway in Las Vegas. Contested over 267 laps on the  asphalt tri-oval, it was the third race of the 2015 NASCAR Sprint Cup Series season. Kevin Harvick won the race, his first of the season, while Martin Truex Jr. finished second. Ryan Newman, Dale Earnhardt Jr. and Denny Hamlin rounded out the top five.

Jeff Gordon set a new track record time on his way to winning the pole for the race. He started the race from the rear of the field after an incident in practice and never led a single lap in his final race at the track. The race had 18 lead changes among nine different drivers, as well as six caution flag periods for 28 laps.

Harvick's 29th career victory was his first at Las Vegas Motor Speedway and the second at the track for Stewart-Haas Racing. With the win, he leapfrogged Joey Logano for the points lead and left the track with a nine-point lead over Earnhardt. Chevrolet increased their lead over Ford to eleven points in the manufacturers' standings.

The race was carried by Fox Sports on the broadcast Fox network for the American television audience. The radio broadcast of the race was carried by the Performance Racing Network and Sirius XM NASCAR Radio.

Report

Background

The complex is owned by Speedway Motorsports, Inc., which is headquartered in Charlotte, North Carolina.

Joey Logano entered Las Vegas with a one-point lead over Jimmie Johnson who scored his 71st career win the previous week at Atlanta Motor Speedway. Kevin Harvick came into Vegas third in the points two back of Logano, having led 116 of the 325 laps at Atlanta. Dale Earnhardt Jr. entered fourth in the points four back, while Martin Truex Jr. entered fifth in the points 13 back.

Entry list
The entry list for the Kobalt 400 was released on Monday, March 2, 2015 at 9:00 a.m. Eastern time. Forty-eight drivers are entered for the race. All 48, except Ryan Blaney and the No. 21 Wood Brothers Racing Ford and Ty Dillon, were entered to race the previous week in Atlanta. Dillon drove the No. 33 Hillman-Circle Sport LLC Chevrolet. No driver was on the initial entry list to drive the No. 34 Front Row Motorsports Ford in place of David Ragan who drove in place of the injured Kyle Busch. On Wednesday, March 4, Brett Moffitt, coming off an 8th-place finish at Atlanta, was named to drive the No. 34 car. Moffitt stated that he was "excited about the opportunity to run some races for Front Row", and that he was "grateful to Bob Jenkins and his team for giving me the chance to do that". Brian Vickers, the driver who Moffitt was driving in place of – at Michael Waltrip Racing – was in the No. 55 Toyota, having missed the first two races while recovering from corrective heart surgery.

First practice
Brian Vickers, making his first start since undergoing heart surgery in December, was 33rd fastest in the session. Vickers described his return as "awesome" and that he was "really excited to be back".

Qualifying

Gordon took pole by 0.052 seconds ahead of Joey Logano, and ultimately described the margin as "real close". Gordon added that he was "just so proud of this team and keeping their heads up". Logano himself repeated Gordon's point on the close margin, adding that his Ford "ha[d] some speed in it which is cool". Dale Earnhardt Jr. qualified fourth, which pleased him, stating that his recent performances on the intermediate tracks gave him "hope it is a sign of things to come". Following a multi-car crash in qualifying at Daytona and 13 cars not making it through inspection at Atlanta, the only hiccup in qualifying belonged to Brad Keselowski. Just as he was about to get in his car to qualify in round 1, a NASCAR official ordered his team to take the car back to the inspection line after witnessing the team pulled out the wheel wells which had been outlawed during the offseason. Reed Sorenson, Mike Bliss, Travis Kvapil, Mike Wallace, and Matt DiBenedetto all failed to qualify for the race.

Qualifying results

Practice (post-qualifying)

Second practice
Aric Almirola spun off of turn 2 and slid down the track with nine minutes remaining in the session. He stopped a few feet short of the inside wall on the backstretch and drove the car back to the garage.

Final practice
In the final minute of the session, Danica Patrick spun out exiting turn 2 and was hit by Jeff Gordon. The resultant damage from the collision forced Gordon's team to switch to their backup car, and as a result, Gordon started from the rear of the field. The collision came just seconds after David Ragan hit the wall in turn 1. He also switched to his backup car and also started from the rear.

Race

First-half

Start
The race was scheduled to start at 3:46 p.m. Eastern time, but started a couple of minutes later when Kasey Kahne led the field to the green flag. He was immediately passed by Joey Logano who took the lead on the second lap. Jeff Gordon, who dropped to the rear of the field for switching to a backup car, moved up to 24th in the first 20 laps. He made it to 21st in the running order when the first caution of the race flew on lap 26. This was a scheduled competition caution, normally done when there has been overnight showers, to allow teams to check tire wear. As Logano was trying to exit pit road, Jeff Gordon, whose stall was right in front of his, blocked his exit momentarily and Dale Earnhardt Jr. exited pit road as the leader. Alex Bowman stayed out to lead a lap before pitting and giving the lead to Earnhardt. Unfortunately for Bowman, his engine started blowing up and he was forced to take his car to the garage.

The race restarted on lap 31 and it did not take long for Logano to find his way back to the lead. Jimmie Johnson reeled in Logano and took the lead on lap 44. Earnhardt Jr. had pulled up to him by lap 63, but had trouble getting around lapped traffic and Johnson pulled away. A number of cars began pitting on lap 75. Johnson gave up the lead on lap 77 to pit and handed the lead to Carl Edwards. He pitted on lap 79 and handed the lead to Matt Kenseth. He pitted the next lap and the lead cycled back to Johnson. Brendan Gaughan and Brian Scott were forced to serve a drive-through penalty for speeding on pit road.

Green flag stops
Debris in turn 1 brought out the second caution on lap 82. This was a saving grace for Brad Keselowski who was reporting a vibration. Aric Almirola was forced to drop to the end of the longest line for speeding on pit road, as did Tony Stewart, as a tire rolled out of his pit box. The race restarted on lap 87. Four laps later, Kevin Harvick powered his way around Johnson, who made an unscheduled stop for a loose wheel, to take the lead. He rejoined the race 33rd one lap down. The next set of green flag stops began on lap 129 when Martin Truex Jr. gave up tenth to pit. Harvick gave up the lead on lap 132 to hit pit road and Keselowski took the top spot. He held the lead for two laps before pitting on lap 134. This allowed his teammate Joey Logano to retake the lead. Keselowski was forced to serve a drive-through penalty for an uncontrolled tire rolling out onto the tri-oval grass area, which brought out the third caution of the race on lap 139.

Second-half
The race restarted on lap 145 and Harvick would lose the lead to Martin Truex Jr. He eventually lost the lead to Harvick on lap 149. The fourth caution of the race flew on lap 172 when Jimmie Johnson blew a right-front tire and his car hit the wall in the tri-oval. Jeb Burton, slowing down to avoid Johnson, got turned into the wall by Jeff Gordon. Joey Logano was forced to drop to the end of the longest line for speeding on pit road. He was joined by David Ragan for an uncontrolled tire.

Trouble for Johnson

The race restarted on lap 178. The fifth caution flew with 82 laps to go when Jimmie Johnson blew another right-front tire and again hit the wall again in turn 4. Upon exiting his car, Johnson explained that on the first puncture, his team believed that "the bead blew on it", while on the second puncture, the tire "went soft going into Turn 3 and I hit the wall, unfortunately". Joey Logano was again sent to the back of the line, for speeding on pit road. The race restarted with 75 laps to go. Carl Edwards pushed Kasey Kahne into the wall exiting turn 4. Kahne, in retaliation, turned down on Edwards in turn 1 and sent him spinning, bringing out the sixth caution of the race with 74 to go. During the period, Aric Almirola was again caught speeding on pit road.

Final stops
The race restarted with 69 laps to go and Dale Earnhardt Jr. took back the lead. He would lose it two laps later to Harvick. He made his final stop with 37 laps to go and handed the lead to Ryan Newman. He went until 25 laps to go before pitting and handing the lead to Brad Keselowski. He pitted with 17 laps to go and Kevin Harvick cycled back to the lead and coasted to his 29th career victory.

Post-race

Driver comments
Harvick felt that it was "so cool to win here in Las Vegas and start this West Coast swing off this way is pretty awesome" and that he was "glad the race is over at that particular point for our own good".

Post-race penalties
The No. 51 team was penalized for a rules infraction discovered during post-race inspection March 8 at Las Vegas Motor Speedway. This infraction is a P3 level penalty and violates the following Sections in the 2015 NASCAR rule book:
 12.1: Actions detrimental to stock car racing;
 20.3.5: Added ballast containers:
 a. Any and all ballast added to the vehicle must be bolted inside an added ballast container, inside the main frame rails, and/or inside the front sway bar.
 b. Added ballast must be secured in a manner that will prevent movement of the ballast during an event.
 20.17.2.2: Overall vehicle weight after competition:
 b. After a vehicle has raced, only water in the radiator, oil in the engine reservoir tank, and fuel in the fuel cell may be added. Wheels and tires may not be changed, unless otherwise authorized by NASCAR Officials.
 c. After a vehicle has raced, the minimum overall vehicle weight of all vehicles must be within 0.5% of the minimum overall vehicle weight required at the start of the race.
Ballast was observed falling off the No. 51 car during the race and the No. 51 car did not meet post-race minimum weight requirements. As a result of the violation, crew chief Steve Addington was fined $25,000.

The No. 2 team was penalized for a rules infraction committed when it was discovered that the right and left rear quarter panel wheel openings were modified after qualifying inspection on March 6. This infraction is a P2 level penalty and violates the following Sections in the 2015 NASCAR rule book:
 12.1: Actions detrimental to stock car racing;
 20.4.b: Body – All approved OEM-manufactured body components must be used as supplied except as required to stiffen, or to attach to other vehicle components. Tolerances from CAD surfaces and template tolerances are provided to allow for manufacturing, fabrication, and installation variability;
 20.4.2: Surface Conformance – Coordinate measuring machines, scanning equipment, and templates, among other tools, will be used to inspect body surfaces for conformance to the approved OEM and NASCAR CAD files.
As a result of this violation, crew chief Paul Wolfe was placed on NASCAR probation through December 31.

Race results

Race statistics
 18 lead changes among 9 different drivers
 6 cautions for 28 laps
 Time of race: 2 hours, 47 minutes, 15 seconds
 Average speed: 
 Kevin Harvick took home $442,415 in winnings

Race awards
 Coors Light Pole Award: Jeff Gordon (27.738)
 3M Lap Leader: Kevin Harvick (142 laps)
 American Ethanol Green Flag Restart Award: Kevin Harvick (30.537)
 Duralast Brakes "Brake in The Race" Award: Jeff Gordon
 Freescale "Wide Open": Kevin Harvick
 Ingersoll Rand Power Move: Austin Dillon, 8 positions
 MAHLE Clevite Engine Builder of the Race: Hendrick Engines, #4
 Mobil 1 Driver of the Race: Kevin Harvick (141.5 driver rating)
 Moog Steering and Suspension Problem Solver of The Race: Kevin Harvick (crew chief Rodney Childers, 0.306 seconds)
 NASCAR Sprint Cup Leader Bonus: Kevin Harvick: $30,000
 Sherwin-Williams Fastest Lap: Kyle Larson (Lap 2, 29.285)
 Sunoco Rookie of The Race: Jeb Burton

Media

Television
Fox Sports covered their fifteenth race at the Las Vegas Motor Speedway. Mike Joy, Larry McReynolds, and Darrell Waltrip had the call in the booth for the race. Jamie Little, Chris Neville, and Matt Yocum handled the pit road duties for the television side.

Radio
PRN had the radio call for the race which was also simulcast on Sirius XM NASCAR Radio. Doug Rice, Mark Garrow, and Wendy Venturini called the race in the booth when the field is racing through the tri-oval. Rob Albright called the race from a billboard in turn 2 when the field went racing through turns 1 and 2 and halfway down the backstretch. Pat Patterson called the race from a billboard outside of turn 3 when the field raced through the other half of the backstretch and through turns 3 and 4. Brad Gillie, Brett McMillan, Jim Noble, and Steve Richards worked pit road for the radio side.

Standings after the race

Drivers' Championship standings

Manufacturers' Championship standings

Note: Only the first sixteen positions are included for the driver standings.

Notes

References

Kobalt 400
Kobalt 400
NASCAR races at Las Vegas Motor Speedway